Sankara Eye Foundation (SEF) USA is a US-based non-profit organization that works toward eliminating curable blindness in India. SEF is a 501(c)(3) registered non-profit organization. The charity has a perfect rating on Charity Navigator.

Beginning
Founded in 1998 by Murali Krishnamurthy, K. Sridharan, and Sridharan's neighbor Ahmad Khushnood with the help of their first donor, Harihara Moorthy. SEF has risen to great heights from its humble beginnings.  At the urging of their uncle Mr. P. Balasubramaniam of India, brothers Murali and Sridharan became motivated to help Sankara Eye Hospital run by Dr.R.V. Ramani, whose mission headquarters is in Coimbatore, India.

Activities

SEF initiates and drives community eye care activities in India by working with Sankara Eye Care Institutions (SECI), India, which runs the "Gift of Vision" rural outreach program through Sankara Eye Hospitals in Coimbatore, Krishnankovil, Bangalore, Shimoga, Guntur, Anand, Pammal and Silvassa. Each hospital is set up to become fully self-sustaining within five years of service. The Gift of Vision program is based on an "80/20" model, i.e., four free eye surgeries are performed for each paid surgery. Thousands of rural poor have received free eye surgeries.

SEF has its headquarters in Milpitas, California. It has 100+ volunteer leaders all around the United States.

The majority of SEF's funds is raised through its own events, booths at other events, donations including Founding Memberships, and advertising. Through these fund-raising efforts, SEF has played a pivotal role in increasing the number of free surgeries for the rural poor more than eightfold since 1998. The projected annual rate is 100,000 free eye surgeries in 2009.

Funds collected under specific programs are sent in its entirety to India. In addition, SEF provides extensive feedback to its donors on how the money is used. SEF has been rated 4-star by Charity Navigator.

Current Focus:

Funds are being raised to:
1) Increase the number of free eye surgeries performed annually at the existing Sankara Eye Hospitals, 
2) Establish a brand new hospital in Punjab (see news item below) 
3) Establish a second brand new hospital in Uttar-Pradesh.

Partner Organizations:

SEF has been supported by various organizations including the Association of Kannada Kootas of America (AKKA), Kannada Koota of Northern California (KKNC), Bay Area Tamil Manram (BATM), Telugu Association of North America (TANA), Asian American Hotel Owners Association (AAHOA), Charotar Leua Patidar Samaj Bay Area (CLiPS), Uttar Pradesh Mandal of America (UPMA) and The Rotary Club of Cupertino (Cupertino Rotary). Save Eye

References

External links
 Sankara Eye Foundation, USA, Official Website
 Sankara Eye Care Institutions (SECI) India
 Sankara receives awards in India and USA
 Rotary Club of Cupertino - Sankara Partnership for Vision

Health charities in the United States
Blindness organizations in the United States
Foreign charities operating in India
Medical and health organizations based in California
Eye care in India